The Government of São Tomé and Príncipe (Portuguese: Governo de São Tomé e Príncipe) is the executive branch of São Tomé and Príncipe. The current government is the XVI Constitutional Government, established on 24 November 2014.

Ministries

Ministry of Agriculture, Fisheries and Rural Development
Ministry of Commerce, Industry and Tourism
Ministry of Education and Culture
Ministry of Foreign Affairs, Cooperation and Communities
Ministry of Health
Ministry of Internal Administration, Territorial Administration and Civil Protection
Ministry of Justice, State Reform, Public Administration and Parliamentary Affairs
Ministry of Labour, Solidarity and Family
Ministry of Natural Defense
Ministry of Natural Resources, Energy and Environment
Ministry of Planning and Finance
Ministry of Public Works, Infrastructure, Transport and Communications
Ministry of Social Communication, Youth and Sports

Constitutional Governments
XI (2006-2008)
XII (2008)
XIII (2008-2010)
XIV (2010-2012)
XV (2012-2014)
XVI (2014-2018)
XVII (2018–present)

References